Harold Keith McDonald (27 June 1922 – 12 June 1999) was an Australian rules footballer who played with Carlton in the Victorian Football League (VFL).

Notes

External links 

Harold McDonald's profile at Blueseum

1922 births
Carlton Football Club players
1999 deaths
Australian rules footballers from Victoria (Australia)